Hela may refer to:

Ethnography
 Hela (people), a name for the Sinhala people of Sri Lanka
 Hela (caste), a Hindu caste found in North India
 Hela Mehtar, Muslim members of this caste
 Hela language, or Elu

Fiction and mythology
 Hela (Blake), daughter of Tiriel in a poem by William Blake
 Hel (being), Queen of Hel and daughter of Loki in Norse mythology
 Hela (comics), Asgardian goddess from the Marvel Universe

Places
 Hela Province, a new province being formed from 4 districts of Southern Highlands Province of Papua New Guinea
 Hela, the German name for Hel, Poland
 699 Hela, an asteroid

Other uses
 HeLa, a line of cells derived from deceased American cancer patient Henrietta Lacks, notable for being the first immortalised cell line
 SMS Hela, a light cruiser of the Imperial German Navy
 Ȟéla, native Lakota name of Kyrie Irving

Language and nationality disambiguation pages